M/T Vulcanus, also known as Vulcanus I, Oragreen, Kotrando, and Erich Schröder, is a freighter first placed in service in 1956 that was used from 1972 to 1990 as an incinerator ship and later as a tanker.

History

Launch and use as a freighter 
In 1955 the Richard Schröder shipping company of Hamburg ordered construction of a dry cargo freighter from Norderwerft Köser & Meyer, also of Hamburg. Built as hull number 818, the ship was launched on November 10, 1955, as the Erich Schröder. After sea trials that began on December 29, 1955, the ship was delivered to the owners on January 17, 1956. It was built as a triple-superstructure ship with the machine room aft and the bridge amidships. It was equipped with three cargo hatches and loading equipment consisting of one 25-metric ton derrick and ten 5-metric ton derricks. In August 1962, the ship was transferred to the Richard Schröder K.G. shipping company, and in February 1972 sold to Ocean Combustion Service N. V. in Rotterdam.

Use as an incinerator ship 
Beginning on February 11, 1972, the new owner had the ship converted into a waste incinerator ship at the K. A. van Brink shipyard in Rotterdam. Tanks for transportation of the waste were added, plus two incinerators located aft, in which the waste would be combusted at temperatures between 1300 and 1400° Celsius. On September 15, 1972, the shipyard delivered the completed ship to Vulcanus Shipping Pte. Ltd. in Singapore, which placed it in service as the Vulcanus. Management of the ship remained with Ocean Combustion Service; it was operated by Hansa Steamship Company of Bremen (Ocean Combustion Service and Vulcanus Shipping both being subsidiaries of Hansa). It was capable of incinerating 400–500 metric tons of waste a day, or approximately 100,000 metric tons a year. The ship primarily operated in the North Sea out of Rotterdam; in 1980 it and other incinerator ships were burning an estimated 80,000 metric tons of wastes including TCDD in the North Sea; but was also used on other routes. For example, in 1974, Shell Oil contracted to have liquid chlorinated hydrocarbon wastes from its Shell Chemical subsidiary incinerated in the Gulf of Mexico, and in 1977 in the South Pacific, Vulcanus disposed of more than 8 million liters of Agent Orange left over from the Vietnam War, in the U.S. Air Force Operation Pacer HO.

Following Hansa's declaration of bankruptcy on August 18, 1980, the Vulcanus continued to operate until 1983, when it was overhauled at the Jurong shipyard in Singapore and equipped with a totally new forecastle equipping it to transport chemical waste. On May 4, 1983, the old forecastle was scrapped at Lien Ho Hsing Steel Enterprise Company in Kaohsiung, Taiwan. The rebuilt ship was again placed in service as an incinerator vessel, now under the name Vulcanus I. At the beginning of 1988, Waste Management, Inc., which had bought Vulcanus I and was then operating it and another incinerator ship named Vulcanus II, withdrew a longstanding application to provide offshore incineration of toxic wastes to the US market. Growing protests by environmental groups led to a decision by the Third International Conference on the Protection of the North Sea in 1990 to ban waste incineration in the North Sea from December 31, 1991. The decision was ratified on June 23, 1990, by the OSPAR Commission. Vulcanus I was then sold that year to the Danish shipping company M.H. Simonsen A.p.S. in Svendborg.

Later career
In 1990, Simonsen registered the ship with Simonsen Tankers Ltd. of Nassau, Bahamas, as the Oragreen, and had it converted into a bunkering tanker. It remained with Simonsen until May 3, 2004, when it was transferred, in Dakar, Senegal, to the Nigerian shipping company Kotram Nigeria Ltd. of Apapa. In 2009, the ship remained registered with Kotram as the Kotrando. She was lost in 2012.

References

Further reading 
 "Müllverbrennungsschiff 'Vulcanus'". Hansa 111.7. April 1974. pp. 519–20. 

Cargo ships of the United Kingdom
1955 ships
Incinerators